Municipal elections were held in South Africa on 5 December 2000 to elect members to the local governing councils in the municipalities of South Africa.

Results
The popular vote, obtained by adding the ward ballots and the municipal proportional representation ballots, were as follows:

References

2000
2000 elections in South Africa
December 2000 events in Africa